The University of Montenegro Faculty of Law (Montenegrin: Pravni fakultet Univerziteta Crne Gore Правни факултет Универзитета Црне Горе), also known as the Podgorica Law School, is one of the educational institutions of the University of Montenegro. The Faculty is Montenegro's leading law school.

History 
The Faculty of Law was established on October 27, 1972. It officially became part of the University of Montenegro on April 29, 1974, when the Agreement on Association into the University of Titograd (today's University of Montenegro) was signed with the representatives of the Faculty of Philosophy, the Faculty of Engineering, the Faculty of Economics, the Maritime Studies College from Kotor and three independent scientific institutes from Titograd. Its main building is located in Podgorica and is shared with the University's Faculty of Political Sciences. Affiliations in Bijelo Polje and Budva function within the Faculty. The Bijelo Polje law school was established in 2010. The Faculty of Law in Budva was opened the same year, at the Academy of Knowledge (Montenegrin: Akademija znanja / Академија знања).

Organization 
The faculty organizes undergraduate, postgraduate specialist and master studies.

Undergraduate studies 
Undergraduate studies are organized on the following study groups of the Faculty:
 Law
 Security and Criminalistics

Postgraduate specialist studies 
Postgraduate specialist studies are organized at the following courses of studies:
 Civil Legal
 Criminal Legal
 International Legal
 Business Legal
 Judiciary
 Constitutional Political
 Legal-Historical

Notable alumni 
 Svetozar Marović - President of Serbia and Montenegro (2003-2006)
 Slavko Perović - founder of the Liberal Alliance of Montenegro
 Miodrag Vlahović - Montenegrin ambassador to the United States (2006-2010)
 Boro Vučinić - head of the Montenegrin National Security Agency (2012–present)
 Željko Šturanović - Prime Minister of Montenegro (2006-2008)
 Draginja Vuksanović - president of the Social Democratic Party of Montenegro

References

External links 
Official website

Law
Law
Law
Law
Montenegro
Law schools in Montenegro
Montenegro 
1972 establishments in Yugoslavia